Mormo (Mormō) or Mormon was a female spirit in Greek folklore, whose name was invoked by mothers and nurses to frighten children to keep them from misbehaving.

The term mormolyce  (pl. mormolykeia ), also spelt mormolyceum  ( mormolukeîon), is considered equivalent.

Etymology
The name mormo has the plural form mormones which means "fearful ones" or "hideous one(s)", and is related to an array of words that signify "fright". 

The variant mormolyce translates to "terrible wolves", with the stem -lykeios meaning "of a wolf".

Description
The original Mormo was a woman of Corinth, who ate her children then flew out; according to an account only attested in a single source. Mormolyca  (as the name appears in Doric Greek) is designated as the wetnurse of Acheron by Sophron ( 430 BC).

Mormo or Moromolyce has been described as a female specter, phantom, or ghost by modern commentators. A mormolyce is one of several names given to the female phasma (phantom) in Philostratus's Life of Apollonius of Tyana.

Mormo is glossed as equivalent to Lamia and mormolykeion, considered to be frightening beings, in the Suda, a lexicon of the Byzantine Periods.

"Mormo" and "Gello" were also aliases for Lamia according to one scholiast, who also claimed she was queen of the Laestrygonians, the race of man-eating giants.

Bugbear
The name of "Mormo" or the synonymous "Mormolyceion" was used by the Greeks as a bugbear or bogey word to frighten children.

Some of its instances are found in Aristophanes. The poetess Erinna, in her poem The Distaff, recall how her and her friend Baucis feared Mormo as children.

Mormo as an object of fear for infants was even recorded in the Alexiad written by a Byzantine princess around the First Crusade.

Modern interpretations
A mormo or a lamia may also be associated with the empusa, a phantom sent by the goddess Hekate.

Popular entertainment
 The Horror at Red Hook by H. P. Lovecraft (1925), describes an inscription to Hecate, Gorgo, and Mormo, found in the raid of Red Hook.

 According to Anton LaVey, in The Satanic Bible, Mormo is the "King of the Ghouls, consort of Hecate".

 Mormo is an evil witch in the 2007 film adaptation of the Neil Gaiman novel Stardust. In the story, she is one of a triune of magically powerful sisters, the others being named Lamia and Empusa. In the book, the characters were not named.

 Mormo is a flying sentient cat in the Tales of the World: Radiant Mythology video game.

In the film The God Makers Ed Decker claims Mormons are followers of Mormo.

Warraguk, a Flying Mormo is a dance suite composed by James Cuomo in the late 1960s, based on concepts from Australian Aboriginal mythology.

"To Switch a Witch", season 3 episode 4 of Scooby-Doo, Where Are You!, describes a symbol on a gravestone as "the Mark of Mormo, a witch's sign".

Explanatory notes

References

Citations

Bibliography 

 
 * Smith, William; Dictionary of Greek and Roman Biography and Mythology, London (1873). "Mormo" 
 

Greek legendary creatures
Mythological anthropophages
Female legendary creatures
Greek folklore
Bogeymen